Tongji University School of Medicine (TUSM) is a school of Tongji University in Shanghai. The main campus of TUSM is located on Siping campus at 50 Chifeng Rd, Yangpu, Shanghai.

History
Tongji University School of Medicine was founded in 1907 by the German doctor Erich Paulon, who established the Tongji German Medical School in Shanghai, China. The foundation was aided by funding from Germany at the beginning.

In 1917, the institutions was renamed to Tongji Medical and Engineering School and later Private Tongji Medical and Engineering Specialist School. The institution has been officially accepted as a university in 1923 and was renamed to National Tongji University and designated as National University of China in 1927. When the anti-Japanese war began 1937, the location of the institution was moved six times. Those cities or provinces were Zhejiang, Jiangxi, Guangxi, Yunnan, Lizhuang, Yibin, and Sichuan in 1940. In 1946, TUSM finally moved back to Shanghai.

Degree programs

As Medicine remains one of the key disciplines of Tongji University, TUSM offers several degree programs.

Chinese taught degree programs

Bachelor of Clinical Medicine
Master of Medicine and Science
Doctor of Medicine (MD)
PhD

English taught degree programs

Bachelor of Medicine
Bachelor of Surgery (MBBS)
Master of Medicine
Doctor of Medicine MD

TUSM also offers other graduate, scientific research, and international medical exchange programs  besides the clinical degree programs.

Clinical institutes and centers

TUSM has seven affiliated teaching hospitals: 
Tongji Hospital
Shanghai Tenth People Hospital
Shanghai East Hospital
Shanghai Pulmonary Hospital
Shanghai First Maternity and Infant Health Hospital
Shanghai Yangpu Hospital
Shanghai Yangzhi Rehabilitation Hospital

References 

Medical schools in China
Tongji University
1907 establishments in China